Nils Oscar Gustafsson (September 25, 1889 - November 12, 1953) was a Swedish amateur football (soccer) player who competed in the 1912 Summer Olympics. He was a member of the Swedish Olympic squad. He did not play in a match, but was a reserve player.

References

External links

1889 births
1953 deaths
Swedish footballers
Sweden international footballers
Olympic footballers of Sweden
Footballers at the 1912 Summer Olympics
Djurgårdens IF Fotboll players
Association football defenders